Mohamad Fasiah bin Mohd Fakeh (Jawi: محمد فسيح بن محمد فقه; is a Malaysian politician. He is chair of Federal Agricultural Marketing Authority (FAMA).

Political career
In May 2013, Mohamad Fasiah first contested to become an MP in the 13th Malaysian general election and subsequently won the Sabak Bernam seat with a 1,890 majority.

He was successfully re-elected as MP for the same seat in the 14th Malaysian general election.

He resigned from UMNO to be an Independent politician in 2018.

Presently he is a member of the Malaysian United Indigenous Party or Parti Pribumi Bersatu Malaysia (BERSATU), a component of Perikatan Nasional (PN) government.

Election results

Honours

Honours of Malaysia
  :
 Officer of the Order of the Defender of the Realm (KMN) (2014)
  :
 Knight Companion of the Order of the Crown of Pahang (DIMP) – Dato' (2014)

References

Living people
People from Selangor
Malaysian people of Malay descent
Malaysian Muslims
Malaysian United Indigenous Party politicians
Former United Malays National Organisation politicians
Members of the Dewan Rakyat
21st-century Malaysian politicians
Year of birth missing (living people)
Officers of the Order of the Defender of the Realm